Gerald Daniel Blanchard (born  in Winnipeg) is a Canadian best known for orchestrating complex frauds and heists on three continents.

Sisi Star Heist

In 1998, Blanchard stole the Star of Empress Sisi, one of 27 diamond-and-pearl hair ornaments worn by Elisabeth of Bavaria, consort of Francis Joseph I, from the Schönbrunn Palace in Vienna, Austria. Police thought that, accompanied by his wife and father-in-law posing as tourists, Blanchard disabled the alarm and replaced the jewel with a replica purchased at the souvenir shop. A parachute was found hidden near the Palace grounds. Blanchard later said that he parachuted onto the Palace roof from a small airplane in the middle of the night to make the swap. A few days before the heist, he toured the palace with his wife and father-in-law while video recording the layout. Police recovered a video tape on one of the many raids of Blanchard's high-end properties, leading up to the theft and the calculated planning. It took two weeks before the swap was discovered. The loss of a priceless part of Austria's history remained unsolved until Blanchard offered to turn the jewel over to police following his arrest in Canada on fraud and robbery charges for cleaning out financial institutions at night without using any violence.

He took police to his grandmother's basement in Winnipeg where he had hidden the Sisi Star. In return for the jewel, Blanchard's co-accuseds would only receive conditional sentences. Blanchard never identified his accomplices in any of his global heists, and he was the only one to do prison time. The priceless Köchert Diamond Pearl was returned to Austria by a Canadian Crown Attorney in 2009.

Blanchard pleaded guilty at the Court of Queen's Bench of Manitoba on 7 November 2007 to sixteen charges of robbery and fraud in Canada and elsewhere in the world. Blanchard faced a maximum of 164 years in prison for the sixteen charges to which he pleaded guilty (had he been sentenced in the US), but was sentenced to just eight years in a Canadian prison. Lawyer Danny Gunn, from Campbell Gunn Inness Law firm, turned over the Köchert Diamond Pearl. After serving two years of his sentence, he was paroled to a halfway house.

After prison

In January 2010, Blanchard was released and was reported to be attempting to develop himself a new career as a security consultant.

On 22 March 2010, Wired posted an article online from their April 2010 issue called "Art of the Steal: On the Trail of the World's Most Ingenious Thief", written by Joshuah Bearman. The piece follows Blanchard's life profiling many of his heists, capture, prosecution, and subsequent release.

A book about Blanchard's infamous theft, titled Stealing Sisi's Star: How a master thief nearly got away with Austria's most famous jewel, by journalist Jennifer Bowers Bahney was released 21 May 2015, and it details the life of Empress Elisabeth of Austria, the history of the Star, and why it meant so much to Austria.

See also
 Frank Abagnale

References

External links
Art hostage blogger says give Gerald Daniel Blanchard a Chance

Living people
Canadian fraudsters
Canadian bank robbers
Jewel thieves
People convicted of fraud
1970s births